Hong Ju-won (Hangul: 홍주원, Hanja: 洪柱元; 1606 – 3 November 1672), formally called Lord Yeongan, of the Pungsan Hong clan (풍산홍씨, 豊山洪氏), was a Joseon nobleman and the husband of Princess Jeongmyeong, only daughter of King Seonjo and Queen Inmok. He was a great-great-great-grandfather of Lady Hyegyeong, Crown Prince Sado's wife.

As a child, Hong learned how to write from his maternal grandfather, Yi Jeong-gwi (이정귀), and from Kim Ryu (김류). In addition, he enjoyed playing with scholars in search of scenic spots. Hong also had a deep friendship with Jo Seok-yun (조석윤) and Park Jang-won (박장원). It was said that he had soft and gentle personality.

Marriage
It was said that Hong already had a fiancée before married Princess Jeongmyeong (정명공주) but, was forced to break with her. In fact, in these periods, the marriage age was early when the status was high, so most of men from nobles family with the same age as the royal princess were forced to marry the princess. A man who has not yet married is either having difficulty to marry due to a problem, or was already engaged like Hong. However, for unknown reasons, he was delaying the marriage as it was impossible for a princess to marry a man with a flaw.

Later, on 26 September 1623, there was a selection (간택) to be Princess Jeongmyeong (정명공주)'s husband, and Hong was the winner. In this marriage, the Princess was still a 21 years old virgin who missed marriage due to her long confined life, so it was unlikely she could find a husband of the same age and must choose a younger man. A day after the marriage, he was honoured as Prince Consort Yeongan or Lord Yeongan (영안위, 永安尉).

About this marriage, his mother in-law, Dowager Queen Soseong (소성대비) was so happy that her beloved daughter finally married him. She was also criticized by Hong even down to the horse that only the King could ride. Meanwhile, when the dying outbreak arose, Right State Councilor Sin Heum (신흠) and Han Jun-gyeom, Internal Prince Seopyeong (한준겸 서평부원군) immediately notified the Dowager Queen, Seonjo's widow and Queen Inyeol, Injo's primary wife.

A few months later, Hong's mother in-law, the Dowager Queen gave him the Eoseungma (어승마, 御乘馬) but she became ill and in 1629, when King Injo tried to comfort her, Hong's father, Hong Yeong (홍영) became Yejochamphan (예조참판). Two years later, in 1631, her health was so poor, so to please her, Injo elevated Hong's qualities and bade him to surprise her with his wife, Princess Jeongmyeong.

Later, after the death of the Dowager Queen, an ugly white paper was found in the couple's residence. Several of the court ladies who served the Princess were involved and were arrested as well as sentenced to death.

Later life
Later, from 4 October 1647 until 27 February, Hong went to Qing dynasty in Saeun Temple (사은사). In 1649, after Yi Ho ascended the throne as the 17th King of Joseon, Hong was honoured as "Gobucheongsicheongseungseubjeongsa" (고부청시청승습정사, 告訃請諡請承襲正使). He later died on 3 November 1672, then received his Posthumous name and Courtesy name.

Others

Benefits about marriage with Princess Jeongmyeong
For Hong, it was an auspicious and normal marriage, but not only himself, his family, the Pungsan Hong clan received many benefits from this marriage. Such as having a close in-law relationship with the royal family and having government positions.

Descendants
This list is just for the notable people of Hong's descendants.
Hong Hyeon-ju, Prince Consort Yeongmyeong (홍현주 영명위), husband of Princess Sukseon
Hong Bong-han (홍봉한), father of Lady Hyegyeong and Hong In-han (홍인한).
Hong Guk-yeong (홍국영)
Royal Noble Consort Won (원빈), consort of Jeongjo of Joseon

Family
Father: Hong Yeong (홍영; 1584–1645)
Grandfather: Hong Yi-sang (홍이상; 1549–1615)
Grandmother: Lady Kim of the Andong Kim clan (안동 김씨; 1554–1616); daughter of Kim Go-eon (김고언)
Mother: Lady Yi of the Yeonan Yi clan (연안 이씨; d. 1656)
Grandfather: Yi Jeong-gwi (이정귀; 1564–1635)
Grandmother: Lady Gwon of the Andong Gwon clan (안동 권씨; 1569–1637); daughter of Gwon Geuk-ji (권극지)
Wife: Princess Jeongmyeong (정명공주; 27 June 1603 – 8 September 1685)
Father-in-law: Yi Yeon, King Seonjo (조선선조 이연; 26 November 1552 – 16 March 1608)
Mother-in-law: Queen Inmok of the Yeonan Kim clan (인목왕후 김씨; 15 December 1584 – 13 August 1633)
Children:
 Son - Hong Tae-Mang (홍태망, 洪台望) (1625–?)
 Son - Hong Man-Yong (홍만용, 禮曹判書) (1631–1692)
 Daughter-in-law - Lady Song of the Yeosan Song clan (여산 송씨)
 Grandson - Hong Jong-gi (홍중기, 洪重箕)
 Granddaughter-in-law - Lady Yi of the Jeonju Yi clan (전주 이씨, 全州 李氏)
 Great-grandson - Hong Seok-bo (홍석보, 洪錫輔) (1672–1729)
 Great-grandson - Hong Hyeon-bo (홍현보, 洪鉉輔)
 Grandson - Hong Jong-beom (홍중범, 洪重範)
 Great-grandson - Hong Jeong-bo (홍정보, 洪鼎輔)
 Great-grandson - Hong Jin-bo (홍진보, 洪晉輔)
 Grandson - Hong Jong-yeon (홍중연, 洪重衍)
 Granddaughter-in-law - Lady Kim of the Cheongpung Kim clan (청풍 김씨)
 Grandson - Hong Jong-bok (홍중복, 洪重福)
 Great-grandson - Hong Gyeong-bo (홍경보, 洪鏡輔)
 Grandson - Hong Jong-ju (홍중주, 洪重疇)
 Granddaughter - Lady Hong of the Pungsan Hong clan (풍산 홍씨, 豊山 洪氏)
 Granddaughter - Lady Hong of the Pungsan Hong clan (풍산 홍씨, 豊山 洪氏)
 Granddaughter - Lady Hong of the Pungsan Hong clan (풍산 홍씨, 豊山 洪氏)
 Son - Hong Man-Hyeong (홍만형, 洪萬衡) (1633–1670)
 Daughter-in-law - Lady Min of the Yeoheung Min clan (여흥 민씨)
 Grandson - Hong Jong-mo (홍중모, 洪重模)
 Great-grandson - Hong Yun-bo (홍윤보, 洪允輔)
 Great-grandson - Hong Geun-bo (홍근보, 洪謹輔)
 Grandson - Hong Jong-hae (홍중해, 洪重楷)
 Great-grandson - Hong Yang-bo (홍양보, 洪良輔)
 Son - Hong Man-hui (홍만희, 洪萬熙) (1635–1670)
 Daughter-in-law - Lady Hwang of the Changwon Hwang clan (창원 황씨)
 Son - Hong Tae-ryang (홍태량, 洪台亮) (1637–?)
 Son - Hong Tae-yuk (홍태육, 洪台六) (1639–?)
 Daughter - Hong Tae-im (홍태임, 洪台妊), Lady Hong of the Pungsan Hong clan (1641–?)
 Son-in-law - Jo Jeon-ju (조전주, 曺殿周) (1640–1696) from the Changnyeong Jo clan (창녕 조씨)
 Son - Hong Man-hoe (홍만회, 洪萬恢) (1643–1709)
 Daughter-in-law - Lady Hong of the Namyang Hong clan (남양 홍씨)
 Grandson - Hong Jong-seong (홍중성, 洪重聖)

In popular culture

Television series
Portrayed by Choi Kwon-soo, Yoon Chan-young, and Seo Kang-joon in the 2015 MBC TV series Splendid Politics.

Arts & Books
Hong liked and enjoyed in Literature, they were such as:
Six Volumes of Muhadangjip (무하당집, 無何堂集)

References

1606 births
1672 deaths
17th-century Korean people